"The Last Man on Earth" is a song by English alternative rock band Wolf Alice. It was released on 24 February 2021 as the lead single for their third studio album, Blue Weekend.

Background
"The Last Man on Earth" was the band's first single in almost 3 years, following an extensive tour through 2018 and early 2019 for their second album, Visions of a Life. Frontwoman Ellie Rowsell said this about the lyrics of the song:

Live performances
The band first played "The Last Man on Earth" live on 5 March 2021, as a pre-recorded video for Later... with Jools Holland. A month later, on 13 April, they shared another performance of the track on their YouTube channel, in a room lit with candles and spotlights.

Release history

References

 

2021 singles
2021 songs
Dirty Hit singles
Wolf Alice songs
Songs written by Ellie Rowsell
RCA Records singles